Savigny may refer to:

Places

In France
Savigny, Aulnay-sous-Bois, a district in Aulnay-sous-Bois in the Seine-Saint-Denis department in the north-eastern suburbs of Paris
Savigny, Manche, in the Manche département 
Savigny, Haute-Marne, in the Haute-Marne département 
Savigny, Rhône, in the Rhône département 
Savigny, Haute-Savoie, in the Haute-Savoie département
Savigny, Vosges, in the Vosges département
Savigny-en-Revermont, in the Saône-et-Loire département 
Savigny-en-Sancerre, in the Cher département 
Savigny-en-Septaine, in the Cher département 
Savigny-en-Terre-Plaine, in the Yonne département 
Savigny-en-Véron, in the Indre-et-Loire département 
Savigny-lès-Beaune, in the Côte-d'Or département 
Savigny-le-Sec, in the Côte-d'Or département 
Savigny-le-Temple, in the Seine-et-Marne département 
Savigny-Lévescault, in the Vienne département 
Savigny-le-Vieux, in the Manche département 
Savigny-Poil-Fol, in the Nièvre département 
Savigny-sous-Faye, in the Vienne département 
Savigny-sous-Mâlain, in the Côte-d'Or département 
Savigny-sur-Aisne, in the Ardennes département 
Savigny-sur-Ardres, in the Marne département 
Savigny-sur-Braye, in the Loir-et-Cher département 
Savigny-sur-Clairis, in the Yonne département
Savigny-sur-Grosne, in the Saône-et-Loire département 
Savigny-sur-Orge, in the Essonne département 
Savigny-sur-Seille, in the Saône-et-Loire département

In Switzerland
Savigny, Switzerland, a commune in the canton of Vaud

People
 Friedrich Carl von Savigny (1779–1861), German jurist
 Marie Jules César Savigny (1777–1851), French zoologist
 Rev. W. H. Savigny (1825–1889), Australian headmaster, father of
 William Savigny (1864–1922), Australian cricketer and teacher
 John Savigny (1867–1923), Australian cricketer
 Annie Gregg Savigny (–1901), Canadian novelist

Other
Savigny-lès-Beaune wine, a wine region in France
Savigny Abbey, a ruined monastery in Savigny-le-Vieux, France
Congregation of Savigny, a Cistercian reform movement originating in this abbey

See also
 Sévigny (disambiguation)